Presidential elections were held in El Salvador on 9 January 1887. Provisional president General Francisco Menéndez was the only candidate. No results were posted.

Results

References

El Salvador
1880s in El Salvador
Election and referendum articles with incomplete results
Presidential elections in El Salvador
Single-candidate elections